Willie Toua Gavera (born 18 August 1988) is a Papua New Guinean cricketer.  Gavera is a right-handed batsman who bowls right-arm fast.  He was born in Port Moresby.

Having played age group cricket for Papua New Guinea Under-19s in the 2008 Under-19 World Cup, he proceeded to be selected as a part of the Papua New Guinea squad for the 2009 World Cricket League Division Three, where he played 5 matches.  He played a single match in the 2011 World Cricket League Division Three, before making his List A debut against Bermuda in the 2011 World Cricket League Division Two.  He played a further 3 List A matches in the competition, the last against Hong Kong.  In his 4 matches, he took 6 wickets at a bowling average of 21.00, with best figures of 3/31.

He made his One Day International debut for Papua New Guinea on 8 November 2014 against Hong Kong in Australia. He made his Twenty20 International debut for Papua New Guinea against Ireland in the 2015 ICC World Twenty20 Qualifier tournament on 15 July 2015.

References

External links
Willie Gavera at ESPNcricinfo
Willie Gavera at CricketArchive

1988 births
Living people
Papua New Guinean cricketers
Papua New Guinean sportsmen
Papua New Guinea One Day International cricketers
Papua New Guinea Twenty20 International cricketers